Dharmaveer is a 2022 Indian Marathi-language biographical political drama film written and directed by Pravin Tarde and produced by Mangesh Desai under the banner of Zee Studios. It covers the story of late Shiv Sena leader Anand Dighe. The film features Prasad Oak, Kshitish Date, Makarand Paddhye, Snehal Tarde and Shruti Marathe in the lead roles. The film was released in Indian cinemas on 13 May 2022 and premiered on ZEE5 on 17 June 2022. The film received positive reviews, praising Prasad Oak's performance as Anand Dighe and Pravin Tarde's screenplay, dialogues and direction. In its first week, the film earned ₹13.87 crore and became huge box office success.

Dharmaveer is a Third highest grossing Marathi film of 2022 at Box office.

Plot
A TV news reporter Tanvi Mahapatra (Shruti Marathe) arrives at midnight of 26 August at Thane railway station upset over her current assignment of covering the 20th memorial service of late politician Anand Dighe in Thane which made her miss her first Bollywood party. Moreover, she is unaware of who the great personality was and the new article archives & internet sources show that after his death, locals destroyed Sunitidevi Singhania Hospital. The reporter meets an auto-rickshaw driver (Gashmeer Mahajani) who decides to drop her to her hotel in Louiswadi and tells her that rather than relying on the internet, she should meet the common Thanekars to whom Anand Dighe Saheb devoted his entire life. The story takes back to the early days of Shiv Sena when a young Anand Dighe Saheb is a party worker. Inspired by his work and dedication, he becomes a prominent member of the party and a very close aide of supremo Bal Thackeray where both share great respect towards one another. At the venue, the reporter meets several people right from his mentees Eknath Shinde, Rajan Vichare, Anita Birje his family of two sisters as well as scores of common Thanekars where she finds that Anand Dighe Saheb was not just a political leader but he was much more to Thanekars and devoted his whole life for them. The great personality met with a tragic end but is still alive in the hearts of Thanekars even after his death.

Cast 
 Prasad Oak as Anand Dighe Saheb
 Shivraj Waichal as Young Anand Dighe Saheb
 Kshitish Date as Eknath Shinde
 Makarand Padhye as Balasaheb Thackeray
 Shruti Marathe as Tanvi Mahapatra
 Gashmeer Mahajani as Sameer
 Vijay Nikam as Mo. Da. Joshi
 Snehal Tarde as Anita Birje
 Vignesh Joshi as Prakash Paranjape
 Abhijeet Khandkekar as Dadaji Bhuse
 Atul Mahajan as Satish Pradhan
 Mangesh Desai as Reporter
 Mohan Joshi as Sameer's Father
 Sagar Pabbale as Rajan Vichare
 Shubhankar Ekbote as Ravindra Phatak
 Jaywant Wadkar as Inspector Yeshwant Tawde
 Yogesh Shirsat as Vasant Davkhare
 Shubhangi Latkar as Meenatai Thackeray
 Devendra Gaikwad as Aatmaram Thorat
 Ramesh Pardeshi  as Hemant Pawar 
 Dushyant Wagh as Dilip  Owalkar; Anand Dighe Saheb's friend
 Prasad Khandekar as Anant Tare
 Jyoti Malse as Malse; Anand Dighe Saheb's sister
 Sayalee Parab as Aruna Dighe; Anand's sister
 Manoj Kolhatkar as Father of raped girl
 Siddhirupa Karmarkar as Mother of raped girl
 Piyush Parmar as Reporter
 Anuj Prabhu as Raj Thackeray
 Sushant Shelar as Inspector Vijay Shelar
 Anshuman Vichare as Hawaldaar
 Sham Mashalkar as Milind Narvekar
 Shivraj Walvekar as Inspector
 Eknath Bhoir as Karyakarta
 Ashish Warang as Ladies bar owner
Nandkumar Gorule as Nandu

Production 
The film was announced on 27 January 2022, by Eknath Shinde. This film is about late Shiv Sena leader. Anand Dighe is based on his life and Marathi film actor Prasad Oak will be seen in the role of Dighe. One of the features of this movie is that the Armada car number 'MH05-G-2013' used by Dighe is used in this movie.

Reception 
Mihir Bhanage of The Times of India gave a rating of 3 out of 5 and wrote that "Prasad Oak brings Anand Dighe to life in this glorified biopic ".

Soundtrack 
The Soundtrack is composed by Chinar-Mahesh and Avinash-Vishwajeet

Accolades

References

External links 
 Dharmaveer at IMDb
Dharmaveer at ZEE5

Indian political drama films
2022 films
2020s political drama films
2020s Marathi-language films
Films set in Maharashtra
Films shot in Maharashtra
Films set in Mumbai
2022 biographical drama films
Indian biographical drama films